The voiced labiodental fricative is a type of consonantal sound used in some spoken languages.

The sound is similar to voiced alveolar fricative /z/ in that it is familiar to most European speakers but is a fairly uncommon sound cross-linguistically, occurring in approximately 21.1% of languages. Moreover, most languages that have /z/ also have /v/ and similarly to /z/, the overwhelming majority of languages with [v] are languages of Europe, Africa, or Western Asia, although the similar labiodental approximant /ʋ/ is also common in India.

In certain languages, such as Danish, Faroese, Icelandic or Norwegian the voiced labiodental fricative is in a free variation with the labiodental approximant.

Features 
Features of the voiced labiodental fricative:

Occurrence

See also
Index of phonetics articles

Notes

References

External links
 

Fricative consonants
Voiced oral consonants
Pulmonic consonants